Adolphus Leigh Fitzgerald (October 24, 1840 – August 31, 1921) was a justice of the Supreme Court of Nevada from 1901 to 1907.

Born in Rockingham County, North Carolina, he received a B.A. and an M.A. from the University of North Carolina, and served in the Confederate States Army during the American Civil War, taking part in the Battle of the Wilderness, the Battle of Petersburg, and the defense of Richmond.

At the close of the war he went to California and became teacher of Latin and Greek in the Pacific Methodist College in Vacaville. He served for a time as deputy state superintendent of schools and was later elected president of the college, which had removed to Santa Cruz, California, remaining in that office for five years. He gained admission to the bar in California in January 1878, and moved to Eureka, Nevada. There he entered into the private practice of law until 1887, when he was elected as a Democrat to a Nevada state district court judgeship. Fitzgerald "attained national prominency in 1896, when he espoused the silver cause and wrote a book on the money question". 

In the 1897 United States Senate election, Fitzgerald received one vote in the Nevada Legislature to be appointed the United States Senator. After fourteen years as a district court judge, he was elected to the Nevada Supreme Court, carrying every county and receiving the largest vote on either ticket. In 1900, he was elected to succeed M. S. Bonnifield as a justice of the Nevada Supreme Court. He served in this capacity for six years, declining renomination. Fitzgerald died at the home of his son Robert in Boston, Massachusetts, at the age of eighty.

References

1840 births
1921 deaths
People from Rockingham County, North Carolina
University of North Carolina alumni
Justices of the Nevada Supreme Court
Chief Justices of the Nevada Supreme Court
Nevada Democrats